Acraea atergatis is a butterfly in the family Nymphalidae. It is found in Malawi, the Democratic Republic of the Congo (Haut-Lomani, Cataractes, Kinshasa), Angola, Zambia, north-western Zimbabwe, northern Botswana and Namibia.

Description

A. atergatis Westw. (55 f) has two rather different seasonal forms. In both forms the wings above are bright uniform orange-yellow to the base, beneath in the dry-season form lighter and in the rainy-season form somewhat darker and more reddish than above; the black dots are arranged as in oncaea, but in the rainy-season form very large and thick; the forewing above is only narrowly black at the costal and distal margins, but without apical spot, and has strong black streaks in 3 to 6; the hindwing is a little blackened at the base of cellule 1 c and the cell; the seasonal forms differ particularly in the development of the marginal band of the hindwing; in the rainy-season form the black marginal band is on both surfaces about 1 mm. in breadth, above unspotted, beneath with narrow streak-like white marginal spots; in the dry-season form the marginal band 
is entirely absent or is only weakly indicated beneath, hence the marginal streaks of the under surface shade into the ground-colour without any dividing-line; the under surface of the hindwing has more or less distinct red spots. Angola; southern Congo region and Rhodesia.

Biology 
The habitat consists of open areas in deciduous woodland.

Adults are on wing year round. There are distinct seasonal forms.

Taxonomy
It is a member of the Acraea caecilia species group. See also Pierre & Bernaud, 2014.

References

External links

Die Gross-Schmetterlinge der Erde 13: Die Afrikanischen Tagfalter. Plate XIII 55 f

Butterflies described in 1881
atergatis
Butterflies of Africa
Taxa named by John O. Westwood